Golujeh-ye Ghami (also Romanized as Golūjeh-ye Ghamī; also known as Kolūjeh-ye Ghamī) is a village in Owch Tappeh-ye Gharbi Rural District, Torkamanchay District, Meyaneh County, East Azerbaijan Province, Iran. At the 2006 census, its population was 37, in 16 families.

References 

Populated places in Meyaneh County